Liver stage antigens (LSA) are a set of peptides from Plasmodium falciparum that are recognized by the body's immune system.

The two most studied ones are:
 LSA-1
 LSA-3

References

Peptides